Midnight Club is a series of arcade-style racing video games developed by Rockstar San Diego (formerly known as Angel Studios) and published by Rockstar Games. Midnight Club is similar to the Midtown Madness series (previously developed by Angel Studios), with a focus on competitive street racing in open world urban environments. Throughout the series, players race through condensed depictions of New York City, London, Los Angeles, Paris, Tokyo, San Diego, Atlanta, and Detroit.

Premise
The Midnight Club series was inspired by the real life Japanese racing group (hashiriya), known as the Mid Night Racing Team, that hosted illegal street runs on the Bayshore Route (known natively as the ) of the Shuto Expressway in the Greater Tokyo Area. Two kanji characters (or "wangan") appear in each of the series' logos; the Japanese manga series Wangan Midnight — also inspired by the club — includes the same two characters in its logos. The kanji is removed from the titles in the Japanese versions of Midnight Club: Street Racing and Midnight Club: Los Angeles as to avoid legal conflict with Wangan Midnight rights owners Kodansha.

In each game, the player begins with a relatively unmodified and slow vehicle. Higher-performance vehicles can be won or purchased by the player after competing in races against other club members. The goal is to defeat each of the other opponents (which include "city champion" and "world champion" racers) en route to becoming the new champion of the Midnight Club. Later installments of the series include real vehicle brands with sophisticated customization options for each, and "club" races, which consist of racers using vehicles of the same class.

Titles

Midnight Club: Street Racing

Midnight Club II

Midnight Club 3: DUB Edition
Midnight Club 3: DUB Edition, developed by Rockstar San Diego and published by Rockstar Games, is the third game in the Midnight Club series. It is also the first game in the series to feature licensed vehicles and allow players to customize their cars and bikes with performance and visual upgrades. It was released for the PlayStation 2 and Xbox on April 11, 2005, and later ported to the PlayStation Portable in June of that same year. The three cities featured are San Diego, Atlanta, and Detroit. The name derived from a partnership between Rockstar and DUB Magazine, which features heavily in the game in the form of DUB-sponsored races and DUB-customized vehicles. The PlayStation Portable port was developed by Rockstar Leeds.

DUB Edition Remix
Midnight Club 3: DUB Edition Remix is an updated version of Midnight Club 3. This edition has an extra map of Tokyo updated from Midnight Club 2 which adds new missions to the game. Along with that come several new cars, new races, new battle maps, rims, vinyls, hydraulics, body kits, and music.

Midnight Club: Los Angeles
Midnight Club: Los Angeles is the fourth addition to the Midnight Club lineup. It was released for PlayStation 3 and Xbox 360 in 2008 on October 20 for North America and October 24 for Europe. As the name suggests, the game is based in Los Angeles, featuring Santa Monica, Beverly Hills, Hollywood, Hollywood Hills, San Fernando Valley, Downtown L.A., and most recently South Central. The designers used real street maps in developing the game. The game features online play and downloadable content. Licensed cars and bikes return, including new models and brands such as Ford and Mazda, which were absent in Midnight Club 3.

L.A. Remix
Midnight Club: L.A. Remix is the portable adaption of Midnight Club: Los Angeles for the PlayStation Portable. The port is developed by Rockstar London with Rockstar San Diego. The game features the map of Los Angeles used in Midnight Club II rather than the map used in the console versions of Los Angeles. The game also features the city of Tokyo, using the map from Midnight Club 3: DUB Edition Remix.

Complete Edition

Reception 

The series has received generally positive views from critics.

Cancellation
In January 2010, Rockstar had stalled plans for a future Midnight Club installment, and the development team was slowly dismantled. Take-Two Interactive re-registered the Midnight Club trademark in 2012. Although Take-Two has acknowledged the series in its quarterly financial reports while CEO Strauss Zelnick mentioned it while discussing newly acquired developer Zynga in a January 2022 conference call, no plans have been made to reboot the franchise .

References

External links
 
 

Open-world video games
Rockstar Games games
Rockstar Games franchises
Street racing video games
Take-Two Interactive franchises
Video game franchises introduced in 2000